"One Time" is a song by Canadian rapper Nav and American rapper Don Toliver featuring fellow American rapper Future. Written alongside Cash XO, producer Wheezy, and co-producer Dez Wright, it was released as the third single from the former's fourth studio album Demons Protected by Angels (2022) on September 13, 2022.

Composition
In the song, Nav details his lifestyle of riches and women as a result of his fame, as well as the positive and negative aspects of it. The chorus is sung by Don Toliver.

Music video
The official music video was released on September 13, 2022 along with the music video of Nav and Lil Baby's song "Never Sleep". Directed by Spike Jordan, it finds Nav, Don Toliver and Future checking in a motel where supernatural events occur, located in the middle of a desert. The clip opens with Toliver sitting on the roof of a Buick in the desert and singing, while women walk past him and enter a bar. Then, the scene shifts to Nav sitting in a motel room, seducing a woman with a dismembered hand laying on the bed next to him. Future appears on television from a set inspired by the Poltergeist film franchise, performing his verse in a bathroom in the company of two women. Toliver appears throughout different locations outside the motel.

Live performances
Nav and Don Toliver performed the song on Jimmy Kimmel Live! on October 4, 2022.

Charts

References

2022 songs
2022 singles
Nav (rapper) songs
Don Toliver songs
Future (rapper) songs
Songs written by Nav (rapper)
Songs written by Don Toliver
Songs written by Future (rapper)
Songs written by Amir Esmailian
Songs written by Wheezy (record producer)
Song recordings produced by Wheezy (record producer)
XO (record label) singles
Republic Records singles